Shwi no Mtekhala is a South African maskandi duo formed in late 1990's. The group was composed of Mandla Xaba and Zwelenduna Rodgers Magubane.

History 
Shwi (born Mandla Xaba) and Mtekhala (born Zwelenduna Rodgers Magubane) met during their childhood at Msinga, KwaZulu-Natal. They relocated to Johannesburg to search for job, they wrote songs for Hlanganani isicathimiaya group.

The duo signed a record deal with Gallo and released their first album Dustbin in 2003.

Two years later they released Wangisiza Baba, which was sold over 500,000 copies in South Africa. The album won Best Selling Album of the Year at the South African Music Awards 2006. Following year at 2007 SATMA awards they won Best Song of the Year and Best Selling Album (Wangisiza Baba).

"Uthando" single featuring South African singer's Nathi Mankayi and Mnqobi Yazo was released on October 16, 2020. They also announced working on an album Wang'khulisa uMama, released on December 18, 2021.

In April 2022, the duo was reportedly disbanded.

Band members 
 Mandla Xaba (1990's-2022)
 Zwelenduna Rodgers Magubane (1990's-2022)

Discography

Studio albums 
 Dustbin (2003)
 Angimazi Ubaba (2006)
 Kukhulu Emgakubona (2007)
 Indod' Endlini (2011)
 Izinto Zomhlaba  (2012)
 Bazali bami (2014)
 Emkhathini (2017)
 Seludlulile (2019)
 Wang'khulisa uMama (2021)

Awards and nominations

References

External links 
 

Living people
People from KwaZulu-Natal
South African musical duos
Year of birth missing (living people)